Sclerema neonatorum is a rare and severe skin condition that is characterized by diffuse hardening of the subcutaneous tissue with minimal inflammation.  It usually affects premature, ill newborns.  Prognosis is poor.

Minimal inflammation helps distinguish sclerema neonaturum from subcutaneous fat necrosis of the newborn.

See also 
 Panniculitis
 Skin lesion
 List of cutaneous conditions

References

External links 

Conditions of the subcutaneous fat
Neonatology